The 2014 Down Senior Hurling Championship was the 106th staging of the Down Senior Hurling Championship since its establishment by the Down County Board in 1903. The championship began on 13 September 2014 and ended on 28 September 2014.

Ballygalget were the defending champions, however, they were defeated in the semi-final stage. St. Patrick's GAC, Portaferry won the title following a 1-12 to 1-11 defeat of Ballycran in the final.

Results

Semi-final

Final

External links
 2014 Morgan Fuels Down GAA Senior Hurling Championship

References

Down Senior Hurling Championship
Down Senior Hurling Championship